Tactusa ostium is a moth of the family Erebidae first described by Michael Fibiger in 2010. It is known from Thailand.

The wingspan is about 11 mm. The ground colour of the forewing is yellow, with an acutely angled blackish patch in the upper medial area and a black subterminal area. Only the subterminal and terminal lines are indicated, the former inwardly outlined by light yellow and the latter with interneural black spots. The hindwing is dark grey with a discal spot and the underside is unicolorous grey.

References

Micronoctuini
Taxa named by Michael Fibiger
Moths described in 2010